Carlos Beltrán may refer to: 

Carlos Beltrán (born 1977), Puerto Rican baseball player
Carlos Beltrán (musician) (born 1957), Mexican multi-keyboard player
Carlos Beltrán Leyva (born 1969), Mexican drug lord